Edwin Mullins (born 1933) is a British art critic, novelist, and television presenter. Among his books is a monograph on Georges Braque. His television series include A Love Affair with Nature (Channel 4, 1985) and 100 Great Paintings.

Works 
 Braque, London, Thames & Hudson, 216 pp., 1968
 The Pilgrimage to Santiago, London, Secker & Warburg, 224 pp., 1974, 
 The Arts of Britain, Oxford, Phaidon, 288 pp., 1983, 
 A Love Affair With Nature, Oxford, Phaidon, 160 pp., 1985, 
 The Painted Witch: Female Body: Male Art: how Western artists have viewed the sexuality of women, London, Secker & Warburg, 230 pp., 1985,

Personal life 
Edwin lives in London with his wife, Anne. He has three children: Fran, Jason, and Selina; and five grandchildren: Ellie, Felix, Tegan, Zoë, and Freddie.

References 

1933 births
Living people
Place of birth missing (living people)
British art historians
20th-century British novelists
British television presenters
British male novelists
20th-century British male writers